Gregory University  (GUU) is located in Uturu, Abia State in Nigeria. It is a Private University named after Pope Gregory I.

The Vice-chancellor of the university is Professor Augustine A. Uwakwe.

Colleges
Gregory University, Uturu (GUU) has about eight colleges which includes the following:
College of Medicine and Health Sciences
College of Law
College of Engineering
College of Agriculture
College of Environmental Sciences
College of Humanities
College of Natural and Applied Sciences
Joseph Bokai College of Social and Management Sciences

Departments

There are over thirty departments currently at Gregory University, Uturu (GUU). They are as follows;

Medicine and Surgery
Human Anatomy
Medical Biochemistry
Human Physiology
Medical laboratory Sciences
Public Health Sciences
Radiography and Radiation Sciences
Optometry
Pharmacy
Civil Engineering
Mechanical Engineering
Computer Engineering
Petroleum Engineering
Electrical and Electronics Engineering
Public and Private Law
Business and Commercial Law
Estate Management
Surveying and Geo-informatics
Quantity Surveying
Urban and Regional Planning
Architecture
Geology
Agriculture
Hotel Management and Tourism
History and International Studies
English Language and Literary Studies
Linguistics and Communication Studies
French and International Studies
Theater and Media Studies
Biology
Chemistry
Biochemistry
Mathematics
Physics
Microbiology
Computer Science
Statistics
Banking and Finance
Accounting
Business Administration
Economics
Industrial Relations and Personnel Management
Political Science
International Relations
Insurance
Sociology
Marketing
Mass Communication
Biology Education
Chemistry Education
Mathematics Education
Guidance and Counseling Education
Business Education
Physical and Health Sciences Education
English Education
French Education

References

Universities and colleges in Nigeria
Education in Abia State
Educational institutions established in 2012
2012 establishments in Nigeria
Christian universities and colleges in Nigeria